Pantelitsa Theodoulou (born ) is a Cypriot individual rhythmic gymnast. She represents her nation at international competitions. She competed at world championships, including at the 2013 World Rhythmic Gymnastics Championships. In 2014, she competed at the 2014 Commonwealth Games, finishing in fourth place in the individual competition.

References

1997 births
Living people
Cypriot rhythmic gymnasts
People from Nicosia District
Gymnasts at the 2014 Commonwealth Games
Commonwealth Games competitors for Cyprus